Jessica Lewis (born 1887, date of death unknown) was an American composer. Her work was part of the music event in the art competition at the 1932 Summer Olympics.

References

1887 births
Year of death missing
American women composers
Olympic competitors in art competitions
Place of birth missing
Polish emigrants to the United States